Sir Edmund Isham (18 December 1690 – 15 December 1772), 6th Baronet of Lamport, Northamptonshire was a Member of Parliament for several successive terms during the reigns of Kings George II and George III of Great Britain.

Biography 

Edmund Isham was born on 18 December 1690 to Sir Justinian Isham, 4th Baronet of Lamport, Northamptonshire and his wife Elizabeth Turnor. He was educated at Rugby School and Wadham College, Oxford and embarked on a legal career, becoming an advocate in Doctors' Commons (1724) and a judge advocate in the Court of Admiralty (1731–41).

He unexpectedly became Baronet of Lamport on 5 March 1737 when his older brother Justinian died young. He was easily elected a few days later on 31 March 1737 to his brother's seat in Parliament as the Tory Member of Parliament for Northamptonshire, and ran unopposed each successive term after that for the rest of his life. He also inherited the family seat of Lamport Hall.

He died on 15 December 1772. Although he had married twice he left no children and was therefore succeeded as baronet by his nephew Justinian Isham, the son of his younger brother, the Reverend Euseby Isham. There is a painting of Sir Edmund by Thomas Hudson hanging at Lamport Hall.

Notes

External links 
 Painting of Sir Edmund Isham by Thomas Hudson

1690 births
1772 deaths
People from West Northamptonshire District
People educated at Rugby School
Alumni of Wadham College, Oxford
Baronets in the Baronetage of England
Members of the Parliament of Great Britain for English constituencies
British MPs 1734–1741
British MPs 1741–1747
British MPs 1747–1754
British MPs 1754–1761
British MPs 1761–1768
British MPs 1768–1774